USS Crest (SP-339) was a United States Navy minesweeper in commission from 1917 to 1919.
 
Crest was built in 1911 as a commercial fishing trawler of the same name at Quincy, Massachusetts. The U.S. Navy chartered Crest in 1917 for World War I service and commissioned her as USS Crest (SP-339) on 8 May 1917.

Fitted out as a minesweeper and assigned to the 1st Naval District, Crest carried out minesweeping, patrol, escort, and rescue operations along the coast of northern New England during World War I.

Crest was decommissioned on 28 January 1919 and returned to her owners in April 1919.

Notes

References

Department of the Navy Naval Historical Center Online Library of Selected Images: U.S. Navy Ships: USS Crest (SP-339), 1917–1919
NavSource Onlline: Section Patrol Craft Photo Archive Crest (SP 339)

Merchant ships of the United States
Ships built in Quincy, Massachusetts
1911 ships
Minesweepers of the United States Navy
World War I minesweepers of the United States